Rudi Lüttge (19 December 1922 – 23 September 2016) was a German racewalker, who competed in the 1952 Summer Olympics.

Career 

Lüttge competed for the clubs BSG Büssing Braunschweig (from 1938 to 1941) and Eintracht Braunschweig (from 1941 on). During his career, he won 16 national championships – 11 in individual competitions and five with the racewalking team of Eintracht Braunschweig.

In 1948, Lüttge set an unofficial world record in the 30 kilometres race walk in Braunschweig's Eintracht-Stadion. The record was never recognized by the International Association of Athletics Federations, as the German Athletics Association had not yet been readmitted as a member after World War II.

Lüttge competed in the 50 km walk at the 1952 Summer Olympics in Helsinki, where he finished 13th.

In 1988, he was inducted into the hall of fame of the Lower Saxon Institute of Sports History. He died on 23 September 2016 at the age of 93.

References

External links 
 

1922 births
2016 deaths
German male racewalkers
German national athletics champions
Athletes (track and field) at the 1952 Summer Olympics
Olympic athletes of West Germany
Sportspeople from Braunschweig
People from Ilsenburg
Eintracht Braunschweig athletes